Brazil is the fifth largest country in the world. It was a colony of Portugal from 1500 until 1815.

Brazil was the second country in the world, after Great Britain, to issue postage stamps valid within the entire country (as opposed to a local issue). Like Great Britain's first stamps, the design does not include the country name.

First stamps

The first stamps of Brazil were issued on 1 August 1843 and are known as "Bull's Eyes" due to their distinctive appearance. On 1 July 1844 a new series was issued which is known as the slanted numeral series. Subsequent stamps were in a similar format until the first pictorial stamps were issued in 1866 depicting Emperor Dom Pedro II

Pedro II issues

In 1866 the emperor was represented on all issues until 1884, first with a black beard.

Recent issues
For many years stamps from Brazil had Brasil Correio displayed on them. However today the trend is to just have the country name and year, e.g. Brasil 2000.

Telegraph stamps

See also
List of people on stamps of Brazil

References

Further reading
 Barata, Paulo Rui. Brazil revenues: Federal, state, and municipal. PUBLIFIL, 1985.
 Brookman, Lester G. The 100th anniversary of the "Bulls Eyes" stamps of Brazil. State College, PA: American Philatelic Society, 1943.
 Ferreira, Henrique Bunselmeyer. Catalogo Ilustrado Dos Carimbos Sobre os Olhos-de-boi. 2011.
 Mayer, Peter. Encyclopaedic catalogue of the stamps and postal history of Brazil: from the origins to 1890. 1999.
 Studart, Marcelo Gladio da Costa. Catálogo Histórico dos Selos do Império do Brasil (1843-1889). 1991.
 Studart, Marcelo Gladio da Costa. Falsificações e Fraudações na Filatelia Brasileira. 1991. Awarded the Alvaro Bonilla Lara Medal in 1995 by the FIAF.
 Taveira, Walter Gonçalves. Brasil 1844–1846: "Inclinados": selos do império do Brasol (segunda estampa). Editora O Lutador. Belo Horizonte, MG. Brasil: Fundação Belgo-Mineira, 2001.

External links

 CDD Catalog of Brazil Stamps
Stamp News - Brazil.

Philately of Brazil